The Jang Bogo-class submarine (Hangul: 장보고급 잠수함, Hanja: 張保皐級潛水艦, formerly romanised as Chang Bogo) is a variant of the Type 209 diesel-electric attack submarine initially developed by Howaldtswerke-Deutsche Werft (HDW) of Germany, intended for service with the South Korean Navy and Indonesian Navy. A Daewoo (DSME)-upgraded model of the Jang Bogo class Type 209 was exported by Korea to Indonesia in 2012, amid heavy competition from Russian, French, and German-Turkish consortiums including from Germany's original Type 209. The variant was considered for possible purchase by Thailand as well, as both newly built and second-hand options. The class is named for ancient Korean maritime figure Jang Bogo.

Armaments 
The Jang Bogo-class submarines are armed with eight bow  torpedo tubes and fourteen torpedoes. The ships are also armed with Sub-Harpoon missiles and can be armed with 28 mines in place of torpedoes and Harpoon missiles. The class is armed with SUT - Surface and Underwater Target Torpedoes.

Upgrades 
The South Korean Jang Bogo-class submarines, originally based on Type 209/1200, had reportedly been heavily upgraded from a time early in the 21st century, which if properly undertaken was supposed to include domestic hull stretch augmentation from 1,200 tons to 1,400 tons, and installment of domestically developed Torpedo Acoustic Counter Measures (TACM). These upgrades could have been affected due to Korean economic problems of the late 1990s, which affected other plans to acquire nine 1,500-ton AIP-equipped boats or upgrade six 1200 boats to 1,500-tons AIP-equipped boats, although the more ambitious plan to acquire nine 1,800-ton Type 214 AIP submarines was preserved and put under progress, which will reportedly be wrapped up in 2018 when all submarines of the type are scheduled to be commissioned. Outfitting the submarines with Sub-Harpoon launching capability was a part of the upgrade, and this seems to have been properly carried out by 2002 on at least one submarine. By 2007, Na Daeyong and Lee Eokgi were demonstrated to have the capability. In the 2008 RIMPAC the submarine Lee Sunshin also demonstrated its sub-harpoon capability. By 2009 it was reported that nine South Korean-modified 1,400-ton Type 209 submarines were in service with the ROKN. As of 2011 they were reported to be 1,200-ton Type 209 submarines. They can equip the White Shark heavy torpedo, and can possibly equip submarine-launched Hae Sung anti-ship missiles later on. LIG Nex1 began producing TACM for unspecified submarine types of the ROKN as well, which finished development in 2000. AIP and flank-array sonars are planned for future modernizations. The Jang Bogo class offered to Indonesia will already be in stretched and augmented forms including guided missile-launching capabilities and a surface displacement of 1400 tons, quite similar to the original plan to upgrade the existing Jang Bogo-class submarines of ROKN to similar specifications.

A science documentary by EBS reported that Jang Bogo-class submarines will undergo major generational overhaul and refit every eight to twelve years. The overhaul and refit involves periodic cutting, complete disassembly, and re-welding of the hull for the upgrade or total replacement of the submarine's old engines, navigational equipment, batteries, and other essential equipment with their modern counterparts. Hull stretch may also have taken place in some of the Jang Bogo-class vessels since the early 2000s, but it has neither been completely confirmed nor denied. Some Jang Bogo-class vessels are demonstrated to have sub-Harpoon launching capability when previously the class was lacking it. ROKN is committed to build and maintain a submarine force of 26 attack submarines until 2025, excluding small and midget submarines, though it is not clear how many submarines among those will belong to the Jang Bogo class. The oldest commissioned Jang Bogo-class submarine by then will be 32 years old.

Lithium-ion battery power stacks are being developed to increase the underwater endurance of Jang Bogo-class submarines by two to three times, offering four to five times the power density of Type 209's current lead-acid batteries and as much as twice the power density of Type 214's BZM 120 fuel cells.

Sales 

In December 2011, DSME won a contract to build six 1,400-ton Chang Bogo-class submarines for Indonesia at a cost of $1.07 billion. Construction of the submarines will start in January 2012 for delivery by 2015 and 2016, for commissioning in the first half of 2018. They'll be equipped with torpedoes and guided missiles. The submarines are described to be Korea's original model, bigger and more advanced than Indonesia's refurbished Type 209/1300. Initially the offered submarines were going to be in-service ROKN submarines. The sale will be done without the involvement of German companies. South Korea is currently the only country outside Germany independently offering the Type 209 for sale. Indonesia was also offered two license built Type 209 submarines manufactured by a group of Turkish (SSM - Undersecretariat for Defense Industries) and German companies (HDW/ThyssenKrupp), a deal reported to be valued at $1 billion. SSM was also offering the leases of Type 209 submarines until new submarines could be completed. The offer has since been superseded by the DSME submarine contract. In early 2012, the Korean defense firm LIG Nex1 exhibited its latest suite of indigenously developed submarine sensors, submarine combat systems, and heavy-weight torpedoes and wire-guided torpedoes in Indonesia for potential use by the Indonesian Navy's submarine forces.

Improved Jang Bogo class
In 2011, DSME signed a contract with Indonesia on for the supply of three Improved Jang Bogo-class submarines. These submarines will be equipped with Atlas Elektronik CSU 90 hull-mounted passive and active search-and-attack sonar and flank sonar arrays, Indra's Pegaso RESM system and Aries low-probability of intercept radar, L3's MAPPS integrated platform management systems and Safran's Sigma 40XP inertial navigation systems.

The improved submarines are also known as s.

In 2019, South Korea signed another contract worth US$1.02 billion to sell three 1,400-ton submarines to Indonesia and would be supported through a loan agreement.

Incidents
On July 15, 2020 05:00 UTC, the Norwegian merchant ship Hoegh London (IMO 9342205) collided with an unknown South Korean Jang Bogo-class submarine near Gadeokdo Island, Busan, South Korea.

Boats in class

Pictures

See also 
 Type 209 submarine
 Type 214 submarine

References

Submarine classes
Attack submarines
Submarines of South Korea
 
Type 209 submarines